MV Isle of Cumbrae is a Caledonian Maritime Assets Limited ro-ro car ferry, built in 1976 and operated by Caledonian MacBrayne. For ten years she was at Largs and operated the Loch Fyne crossing from 1999 to 2014. She returned to Tarbert in 2016 after  was moved to the Mallaig - Armadale station. She is now the oldest vessel in the Calmac fleet.

History
Isle of Cumbrae was built in 1976 by Ailsa Shipbuilding Company of Troon. A crew mess room was added aft of the passenger saloon in early 1994, with the upper deck extended over it. In early 2002, she was re-engined with Scania diesels.

Layout
She has three lanes on her car deck, with ramps at either end which fold in two sections, like those on the Island Class ferries. Passenger accommodation is down the starboard side, with a small wheelhouse above.

Voith Schneider units at diagonally opposite corners of her hull provide propulsion.

Service

In August 1986, Isle of Cumbrae moved to the Fishnish – Lochaline crossing in the Sound of Mull, replacing the small . She remained there until July 1997, when she was replaced by the larger . Isle of Cumbrae replaced  in the Kyles of Bute, but was herself replaced by the much larger  in 1999. She then transferred to the summer Tarbert – Portavadie route across Loch Fyne.

In 2014, she was replaced by the diesel-electric hybrid ferry , becoming a spare vessel. The 2015 season saw her back at Largs while covering for a broken-down  and providing additional sailings from Claonaig to Lochranza alongside  during the Brodick Highland Games, before going back to Tarbert and lying spare.

In early 2016, she returned to the Tarbert – Portavadie route after  moved to the Mallaig - Armadale station.

References

External links
MV Isle of Cumbrae on www.calmac.co.uk

Caledonian MacBrayne
1976 ships
Ships built in Scotland